Anas Walid Khaled Bani Yaseen (born 29 November 1988) is a Jordanian footballer who plays as a centre-back for Al-Faisaly and the Jordan national team.

International goals
Scores and results list Jordan's goal tally first.

See also
 List of men's footballers with 100 or more international caps

References

External links 
 goalzz.com
 
 
 jfa.com.jo

Living people
Jordanian footballers
Jordan international footballers
Jordan youth international footballers
Association football defenders
1988 births
2011 AFC Asian Cup players
2015 AFC Asian Cup players
2019 AFC Asian Cup players
FIFA Century Club
Al-Arabi (Jordan) players
Al-Ramtha SC players
Shabab Al-Ordon Club players
Al-Faisaly SC players
Al-Hussein SC (Irbid) players
Najran SC players
Al-Raed FC players
Al Wahda FC players
Al Dhafra FC players
Qadsia SC players
Foolad FC players
Al-Markhiya SC players
Jordanian Pro League players
UAE Pro League players
Saudi Professional League players
Qatari Second Division players
Kuwait Premier League players
Persian Gulf Pro League players
Jordanian expatriate footballers
Jordanian expatriate sportspeople in Qatar
Jordanian expatriate sportspeople in Saudi Arabia
Jordanian expatriate sportspeople in Iran
Jordanian expatriate sportspeople in Kuwait
Jordanian expatriate sportspeople in the United Arab Emirates
Expatriate footballers in the United Arab Emirates
Expatriate footballers in Saudi Arabia
Expatriate footballers in Kuwait
Expatriate footballers in Iran
Expatriate footballers in Qatar